The Peacemaker is a 1997 American political action thriller film starring George Clooney, Nicole Kidman, Armin Mueller-Stahl, Marcel Iureș and Aleksandr Baluev and directed by Mimi Leder. It is the first film by DreamWorks Pictures. While the story takes place all over the world, it was shot primarily in Slovakia with some sequences filmed in New York City and Philadelphia.

The basis for the film was the 1997 book One Point Safe, about the state of Russia's nuclear arsenal.

Plot
Outside a church celebrating an Eastern Orthodox baptism in Pale, Bosnia, the Bosnian Finance Minister, a moderate pushing for peace in the ongoing Yugoslav Wars, is murdered.

At a missile base in Kartaly (Chelyabinsk Oblast), Russia, ten R-36M2 Mod. 5, 550–750 kiloton MIRV  nuclear warheads that belong to a SS-18 Satan ICBM are loaded onto a train for transport to a dismantling facility. However, Russian Army General Aleksandr Kodoroff, along with a rogue Spetznaz unit, kills the soldiers on board the transport train and transfers nine of the warheads to another train. Kodoroff then activates the timer on the remaining warhead and sends the transport on a collision course with a passenger train. Minutes later, the 500-kiloton warhead detonates, killing thousands of civilians and delaying an investigation of the accident.

The detonation immediately attracts the attention of the US government. Dr. Julia Kelly, head of the National Security Council Nuclear Smuggling Group, believes that Chechen terrorists are behind the incident. Former US Army Ranger and Special Forces turned Military Intelligence Lieutenant Colonel Thomas Devoe interrupts her briefing to suggest that the incident was staged to hide the hijacking of the warheads. A call to Devoe's friend and Russian counterpart, FSB Colonel Dimitri Vertikoff, adds reliability to his theory and he is assigned as Kelly's military liaison.

Kelly and Devoe secure information about the terrorist's hijacking operation through an Austrian trucking company that works as a front for the Russian Mafia. They meet Vertikoff in Vienna, then they assume identities to visit Shummaker, who organizes the Russian's trucking. After Devoe tortures Shummaker for information, he and Kelly leave the building and get in Vertikoff's car. They are chased through Vienna by Shumaker's men, who kill Vertikoff while he's offering a bribe. Devoe shoots at the attackers and drives away, but finds he and Kelly are being followed. A wild drive through the city ensues, followed by a fiery crash. Devoe and Kelly escape unharmed.

Information from the trucking company says that the nukes are going to Iran via a route through Azerbaijan. When US spy satellites place the truck in a traffic jam of refugees in Dagestan, Devoe uses a ruse to identify it. This information is passed on to Russian authorities in hopes of stopping the transfer to Iran. The Russian military stops Kodoroff at a roadblock, but he and his men kill the soldiers.

Devoe leads an airborne Special Operations team from a U.S. base in Turkey to stop them. Denied entry into Russian airspace, one of the three Special Ops helicopters is shot down by a Russian surface-to-air missile, but the remaining two manage to locate Kodoroff's truck. They fire missiles which disable Kodoroff's truck, then engage in a gunfight, killing Kodoroff and securing the warheads. Interrogation of the surviving member of the group, a U.S. educated Pakistani nuclear scientist, reveals that one warhead had been sent off with an operative before the truck was intercepted.

The information from the trucking company leads IFOR to a Sarajevo address. Inside is a video cassette of a Bosnian named Dušan Gavrić, who disclaims allegiance to any particular faction in the Yugoslav Wars, but blames other countries for supplying weapons to all sides in the war. Kelly's further analysis of the trucking company documents suggests that Gavrić intends to bomb a meeting at the UN headquarters in New York City. Gavrić arrives in Manhattan with the Bosnian diplomatic delegation.

A flashback shows that Gavrić wants to avenge the death of his wife and daughter, who were killed in Sarajevo during a sniper attack. He and his brother are later found by Devoe and Kelly. When his brother is killed by Devoe, a wounded and enraged Gavrić flees into a parochial school where he's seen in the church sanctuary. Devoe and Kelly confront Gavrić, who commits suicide, knowing that the bomb is set to go off in a matter of minutes. With only seconds to spare, Dr. Kelly is able to remove part of the explosive lens shell of the bomb and to stop the primary explosion from establishing critical mass within the plutonium core. The primary explosives detonate, wrecking the church, as Devoe and Kelly dive out of a window. Kelly's manipulation of the warhead prevent it from detonating as a nuclear explosion.

After the nuclear incident is over, Kelly is seen swimming laps in a pool. Devoe stops by and asks her out for a drink, which she accepts.

Cast

Release

Box office
The Peacemaker earned $41,263,140 in the US and $69,200,000 elsewhere, bringing its total to $110,463,140.

Critical reception
On review aggregator Rotten Tomatoes, the film has a 46% approval rating based on 37 reviews, with an average score of 6/10. On Metacritic, the film has a score of 43 out of 100, based on 20 critics, indicating "mixed or average reviews". Audiences polled by CinemaScore gave the film an average grade of "B+" on an A+ to F scale.

Janet Maslin of The New York Times gave praise to Clooney and Kidman for portraying a "charming rogue" and expressing "womanly professionalism as fierce, hostile sterneness" in their respective roles and Leder's direction of the movie's action setpieces, highlighting the Manhattan climax for having "crisp economy and furious energy" throughout the scene. Marc Savlov of The Austin Chronicle said that despite the "ever-present plot holes and isoscelean character arcs" throughout the film's story and villains, he praised Leder's directorial skills for keeping things fresh throughout the runtime and adding "clever swagger" to the action scenes, concluding that: "By no means an embarrassment to the fledgling DreamWorks, The Peacemaker is instead a grand, noisy step in the right direction. What next, indeed?" Roger Ebert commended the "technical credits" and both Clooney and Kidman for expertly fulfilling their roles but felt the rest of the film was filled with "retreaded" and "off-the-shelf" thriller clichés and concluded with a bomb defusal third act that lacked the "real endings involving character developments and surprises" found in similar films like The Edge and Kiss the Girls. Entertainment Weeklys Owen Gleiberman gave the film an overall "C+" grade, giving Leder's direction credit for staging her scenes with "crisp exactitude, [and with] a pleasing flair for "rhythmic" visual detail" and adding "elegant and accomplished" atmospherics, but felt that it amounts to being "a well-crafted, utterly generic genre piece" that carries "an air of self-important solemnity that borders on the overblown", concluding that: "In The Peacemaker, nothing escapes the taint of cliche. As the inaugural feature from DreamWorks, the picture is vaguely depressing, because it suggests that the studio’s creators are working so laboriously to manufacture a hit that they’ve forgotten to put in the dream." James Berardinelli criticized the over-long runtime of the movie's "paper-thin plot", the "lack of creativity" in the death scenes and failing to sympathize with the villains' plight, concluding that: "The Peacemaker isn't much better or worse than the average James Bond movie, except, of course, that it doesn't have the cars, the gadgets, the girls, or Bond himself. There's a certain appeal to the premise, but the execution is uneven. The movie is likely to keep an audience's attention, but it's the kind of film that is quickly forgotten."

References

External links
 
 
 
 

1997 films
1997 action thriller films
1997 directorial debut films
1990s chase films
American action thriller films
American chase films
American films about revenge
American political thriller films
Bosnian War films
DreamWorks Pictures films
Films about diplomacy
Films about diplomats
Films about nuclear war and weapons
Films about terrorism
Films about the United Nations
Films about United States Army Special Forces
Films based on non-fiction books
Films directed by Mimi Leder
Films produced by Walter F. Parkes
Films scored by Hans Zimmer
Films set in Austria
Films set in New York City
Films set in Serbia
Films set in Russia
Films shot in Slovakia
Films shot in New York City
Films shot in Philadelphia
1990s Russian-language films
Serbo-Croatian-language films
Films about the Serbian Mafia
1990s English-language films
1997 multilingual films
American multilingual films
1990s American films
Films about train robbery